The first season of the long-running Australian outback drama McLeod's Daughters began airing on 8 August 2001 and concluded on 22 March 2002 with a total of 22 episodes. Created by Posie Graeme-Evans and Caroline Stanton, the format is produced by Millennium Television and Nine Films and Television for the Nine Network distributed by Southern Star Group.

Plot
Having spent most of her life in the city, Tess Silverman returns home when she inherits part of Drover's Run, a cattle station passed down the generations of the McLeod family, from her late father, Jack McLeod. There she meets her estranged half-sister, Claire, after twenty years of separation. Tess announces that her mother Ruth, Jack's second wife and Claire's step mother, died recently. Claire, now in charge of the property, is placed in a desperate position when she discovers her farmhands have breached her trust, as they did her father, and fires them. With the future of Drover's Run now in jeopardy, Claire enlists the help of her sister, along with the local wayward delivery girl, Becky, the housekeeper of Drover's, Meg, and Meg's spoiled daughter, Jodi. Against all odds, they form an unlikely workforce, in the hope of saving the land and the property.

Claire, at first, struggles to bond with Tess, more so when she discovers Tess' secret – she plans to sell her share of the heritage and fulfil her dream of owning a café in the city, much to Claire's worry when she tries to convince Tess that in doing so could spell disaster for Drover's Run.

Cast

Regular
 Lisa Chappell as Claire McLeod
 Bridie Carter as Tess Silverman McLeod
 Jessica Napier as Becky Howard
 Rachael Carpani as Jodi Fountain
 Aaron Jeffery as Alex Ryan
 Myles Pollard as Nick Ryan
 Sonia Todd as Meg Fountain

Recurring
 John Jarratt as Terry Dodge
 Marshall Napier as Harry Ryan
 Catherine Wilkin as Liz Ryan
 Fletcher Humphrys as Brick Buchanon

Guest
John Sheerin as Brian Cronin
 Rodger Corser as Peter Johnson
Carmel Johnson as Beth Martin
Ben Mortley as Alberto Borelli
 Luke Ford as Craig Woodland

Episodes

Production
Following the success of the 1996 telemovie, which was intended to serve as a pilot for the series, the creators had expectations that the Nine Network would commission a subsequent series. However, Nine initially rejected any plans to pick up a series, stating that they did not believe a female-driven drama would appeal to audiences. In a further attempt to negotiate a deal, Nine decided to make a compromise to order three more telemovies, to no avail. They later accepted a deal to commission a season of 13 episodes, before expanding to 22 episodes.

The series was filmed on location in the same area as the telemovie. When Nine decided to proceed with the series, they purchased the 55-hectare property in Kingsford, South Australia in 1999, which included the decrepit 145-year-old sandstone homestead.

Reception

Ratings
On average, McLeod's Daughters received an audience of 1.51 million, and ranked #7 for its first season. The series premiere was watched by 1,890,000 viewers.

Awards and nominations
The first season of McLeod's Daughters received one win and one nomination at the 2002 Logie Awards.

 Logie Award for Most Popular Australian Program – Nomination
 Logie Award for Most Popular New Female Talent – Win (Lisa Chappell)

Home media

References

McLeod's Daughters seasons
2001 Australian television seasons
2002 Australian television seasons